Emmering may refer to places in Bavaria, Germany:

Emmering, Ebersberg, in the district of Ebersberg
Emmering, Fürstenfeldbruck, in the district of Fürstenfeldbruck